Mystery ER is a medical reality program, created by Mike Mathis for the Discovery Health Channel. The show features reenactments of real-life medical mysteries, told through narration and interviews.

References

External links

Discovery Channel original programming
2000s American reality television series
2007 American television series debuts
2008 American television series endings